Montù Beccaria is a comune (municipality) in the Province of Pavia in the Italian region Lombardy, located about  south of Milan and about  southeast of Pavia.

Montù Beccaria borders the following municipalities: Bosnasco, Canneto Pavese, Castana, Montescano, Rovescala, San Damiano al Colle, Santa Maria della Versa, Stradella, Zenevredo.

Demographic evolution

References

Cities and towns in Lombardy